The Othmer Gold Medal recognizes outstanding individuals who contributed to progress in chemistry and science through their activities in areas including innovation, entrepreneurship, research, education, public understanding, legislation, and philanthropy. The medal is presented annually under the sponsorship of the Science History Institute (formerly the Chemical Heritage Foundation) and four affiliated organizations: the American Chemical Society (ACS), the American Institute of Chemical Engineers (AIChE), The Chemists' Club, and the American section of the Société de Chimie Industrielle, at the Science History Institute's Heritage Day.   

The Othmer Medal commemorates chemist Donald Othmer (1904–1995), a researcher, engineer, inventor, philanthropist, professor, and co-editor of the Kirk-Othmer Encyclopedia of Chemical Technology.  Each year, the recipient of the award designates an institution to receive a copy of the 26 volume Kirk-Othmer Encyclopedia of Chemical Technology from John Wiley & Sons, Inc.

Recipients 
The award is given yearly and was first presented in 1997.

Photo Gallery

See also

 List of chemistry awards

References

Chemistry awards